Carlo Donelli (Milan, 1661–1715) was an Italian painter, known as Vimercati.

Biography
Donelli was probably a pupil of Ercole Procaccini the Younger and his training included the study of Daniele Crespi’s frescoes for the Carthusian monastery in Garegnano. Influenced by the painting of the Venetian Tenebrists, possibly through the work of Filippo Abbiati, he worked at first in the provinces (Codogno and Varese) and then on various churches in Milan. While few of Donelli’s works survive, significant evidence of his style is provided by his altarpiece of Saint Anne Offering Mary to the Eternal Father for the Sanctuary of Our Lady of Sorrows in Rho.

References
 Domenico Sedini, Carlo Donelli, online catalogue Artgate by Fondazione Cariplo, 2010, CC BY-SA (source for the first revision of this article).

Other projects

17th-century Italian painters
Italian male painters
18th-century Italian painters
1661 births
1715 deaths
Painters from Milan
18th-century Italian male artists